Anna Slater is a Royal Society Dorothy Hodgkin Fellow at the Materials Innovation Factory at the University of Liverpool.

Education 
Anna Slater studied chemistry at the University of Nottingham, which she graduated in 2006. Slater completed a PhD at the University of Nottingham under the supervision of Professor Neil Champness in 2011.

Career 
In 2013 Slater joined the group of Professor Andy Cooper at the University of Liverpool, where she worked on porous organic cages. She is interested in supramolecular chemistry. In 2015 she published "Function-led design of new porous materials" in Science. She was shortlisted in the 2016 Women of the Future awards in the science category.

In 2016 she was appointed an EPSRC Dorothy Hodgkin Fellow. She looks to develop new functional materials through continuous flow chemistry at the University of Liverpool. Her half-a-million pound grant, "High Throughput Materials Development in Continuous Flow", is supported by the Royal Society. She took part in the Sci Annual Review Meeting, talking about new concepts in organic synthesis.

Slater was co-chair of the UK Research Staff Association (UKRSA). Slater led a project looking at how researchers took maternity, paternity, adoption, and parental leave. In 2016 she discussed barriers to mothers from pursuing academia.

In 2017, Slater took an exhibit titled "No Assembly Required" to a special joint Royal Society/Science Museum "Lates", part of a series of events open to adult members of the public that typically attracts over 4000 people. As part of the exhibit, Slater worked with Senior Lecturer and science poet Dr Sam Illingworth to produce a series of poems written by the visitors using language from scientific papers in the field.

References 

Living people
British chemists
British women chemists
British women scientists
Alumni of the University of Nottingham
Year of birth missing (living people)